Olga Eduardovna Landik (born 2 January 1980) is a retired Russian breaststroke swimmer who won a silver medal in the 4×100 m medley relay at the 1997 European Aquatics Championships. She also competed in the 100 m breaststroke at the 1996 Summer Olympics.

Landik started swimming in a club since 1987, and in 1994 won a gold medal at the Junior European Championships. During her career she won 10 national senior titles. After retirement, she worked as a swimming coach (1998-2000) and then as a stylist. In 2003, she graduated with honors from a Sports Academy and later enrolled to the Saint Petersburg State Polytechnical University.

References

1980 births
Living people
Olympic swimmers of Russia
Swimmers at the 1996 Summer Olympics
Russian female breaststroke swimmers
European Aquatics Championships medalists in swimming